The president of the Republic of Kenya is the head of state and head of government of the Republic of Kenya. The President is also the head of the executive branch of the Government of Kenya and is the commander-in-chief of the Kenya Defence Forces.

History 
Kenya's pre-independence constitution was based on the standard "Lancaster House template" used for the former British colonies in Africa, subject to early amendments. It was replaced in 1969.

Under the Independence Constitution, the British monarch, Queen Elizabeth II, was the country's head of state, represented locally by a Governor-General of Kenya, who was the head of government. In 1964, the year after the country gained independence from Britain, the 1963 Constitution was amended to make the country a republic, with the President now serving as both head of state and head of government.

Kenya has had a total of 5 presidents since independence, in successive order: Jomo Kenyatta, Daniel arap Moi, Mwai Kibaki, Uhuru Kenyatta, and the incumbent, William Ruto, who was inaugurated on 13 September 2022. Moi remains the country's longest serving President, having served for a total of 24 years.

Qualifications and election to office 
According to the current Constitution, if a person wishes to be elected as President, the following qualifications must be met: 

 Should be a Kenyan citizen by birth; 
 Should be qualified for election as a Member of Parliament;
 Should have been nominated by a political party to stand as its candidate for the Presidency, or they may stand as an independent candidate; and
 The person should have been nominated by more than two thousand voters from each of a majority of the country's 47 counties.

A candidate will be disqualified to run for presidency if they have allegiance to a foreign state or is working for the government in any capacity as a public officer. Being a public officer is not applicable to the incumbent President if running for a second term.

The President is elected by popular vote in the general election held in the month of August every 5 years. For a presidential candidate to be declared the winner, they must have:

 More than half of the total votes cast in the election; and
 At least 25% of the votes cast in each of more than half of the 47 counties in the country.

The official residence of the President of Kenya is State House, Nairobi.

The wife of the President is referred to as the First Lady of Kenya.

Term of office 
A president is eligible for two consecutive terms of five years each, starting from the date the president is sworn in.

Roles and responsibilities 
The following is a summary of the roles of the President of Kenya as provided in the Constitution of Kenya:
 Is the country's Head of State and Government.
 Exercises the country's executive authority.
 Is the Commander-in-Chief of the country's military, the Kenya Defence Forces.
 Is the chairperson of the country's National Security Council.
 Is a symbol of national unity.
The responsibilities of the President are summarised as follows:
 Is responsible for addressing each newly elected Parliament and report once to special parliamentary seating concerning issues of national value and governance.
 Holds nominating and appointing authority, with Parliament's approval, over the country's Cabinet Secretaries, Attorney-General, Principal Secretaries, diplomatic & consular representatives and any other public officer over whom the Constitution grants said authority.
 Is the chairperson of Cabinet meetings and oversees the running of operations in various ministries and government departments.
 The President may also undertake any other executive functions as permitted by the Constitution.
 The President also exercises the power of mercy, whereupon the President may pardon a person convicted of an offence.
Additionally, a person serving as President has legal immunity, with the exception of crimes under treaties to which Kenya is party with provisions that prohibit such immunity.

List of presidents

Presidential standards

See also
 List of colonial governors of Kenya
 List of heads of state of Kenya
 Lists of incumbents
 Politics of Kenya
 Prime Minister of Kenya

References

External links 
 

 
1964 establishments in Kenya